King Arthur's family grew throughout the centuries with King Arthur's legend. Many of the legendary members of this mythical king's family became leading characters of mythical tales in their own right.

Medieval Welsh tradition

In Welsh Arthurian pre-Galfridian tradition, meaning from before the time of Geoffrey of Monmouth's 12th-century Historia Regum Britanniae (History of the Kings of Britain), Arthur was granted numerous relations and family members. Several early Welsh sources are usually taken as indicative of Uther Pendragon being known as Arthur's father before Geoffrey wrote, with Arthur also being granted a brother (Madog) and a nephew (Eliwlod) in these texts. Arthur also appears to have been assigned a sister in this material – Gwalchmei is named as his sister-son (nephew) in Culhwch and Olwen, his mother being one Gwyar. Culhwch and Olwen, the Vita Iltuti and the Brut Dingestow combine to suggest that Arthur's own mother was named Eigyr. Culhwch and Olwen also gives Arthur's half-brother as Gormant, son of Arthur's mother and Ricca, the chief elder of Cornwall, a parallel of later stories of Gorlois, Duke of Cornwall.

The genealogies from the 13th-century Mostyn MS. 117 assert that Arthur is the son of Uthyr, the son of Custennin, the son of Cynfawr, the son of Tudwal, the son of Morfawr, the son of Eudaf, the son of Cadwr, the son of Cynan, the son of Caradoc, the son of Bran, the son of Llŷr. Regarding Arthur's own family, his wife is consistently stated to be Gwenhwyfar, usually the daughter of King Ogrfan Gawr (variation: 'Gogrfan Gawr', "[G]Ogrfan the Giant") and sister to Gwenhwyfach, although Culhwch and Bonedd yr Arwyr do indicate that Arthur also had some sort of relationship with Eleirch daughter of Iaen, which produced a son named Kyduan (Cydfan). Kyduan was not the only child of Arthur according to Welsh Arthurian tradition – he is also ascribed sons called Amr (Amhar), Gwydre, Llacheu and Duran. (See the Offspring section for further information about Arthur's children.)

In addition to this immediate family, Arthur was said to have had a great variety of more distant relatives, including maternal aunts, uncles, cousins and a grandfather named Anlawd (or Amlawdd) Wledig ("Prince Anlawd"). The latter is the common link between many of these figures and Arthur: thus the relationship of first cousins that is implied or stated between Arthur, Culhwch, Illtud, and Goreu fab Custennin depends upon all of their mothers being daughters of this Anlawd, who appears to be ultimately a genealogical construct designed to allow such inter-relationships between characters to be postulated by medieval Welsh authors. Arthur's maternal uncles in Culhwch and Olwen, including Llygatrud Emys, Gwrbothu Hen, Gweir Gwrhyt Ennwir and Gweir Baladir Hir, similarly appear to derive from this relationship.

Other medieval literature

Relatively few members of Arthur's family in the Welsh materials are carried over to the works of Geoffrey of Monmouth and chivalric romancers. His grandfather Anlawd Wledic and his maternal uncles, aunts and cousins do not appear there, and neither do any of his sons or his paternal relatives. Only the core family seem to have made the transition: his wife Gwenhwyfar (who became Guinevere), his father Uthyr (Uther), his mother Eigyr (Igerna), and his sister-son Gwalchmei (Gawain). The place of Gwalchmei's mother Gwyar's was taken by Anna, the wife of Loth, in Geoffrey's account, whilst Modredus (Mordred) was made into her second son (a status he did not have as Medraut in the Welsh material).

In addition, new family members enter the Arthurian tradition from this point onwards. Uther is given a new family, including two brothers and a father, while Arthur gains a sister or half-sister, Morgan, first named as his relative by Chrétien de Troyes in Yvain. A new son of Arthur, named Loholt, is introduced in Chrétien's Erec and Enide. Another significant new family-member is Arthur's other sister or half-sister known by several names including Morgause, daughter of Gorlois and Igerna (Igraine) and mother of Gawain and Mordred, replacing Anna in the romances. They may be joined by a third half-sister, today best known as Elaine. Drawing on earlier sources, Richard Carew mentions another sister from Igraine and Uther, named Amy. The overall number of Arthur's sisters or half-sisters varies between the different romances, ranging from as few as one or two to as many as five (in which case one of them may die early). Their names and roles also vary, as do their husbands (most commonly including the British kings Lot, Urien and Nentres, the last one of them being largely interchangeable with the other two).

Through the sisters, Arthur is given further nephews (Gawain, Agravain, Gaheris and Gareth by Morgause; Galeschin by Elaine; and Yvain by either Morgan or the fourth sister), who all become Knights of the Round Table. The Brut Tysilio makes Gorlois also the father of Cador, who is thus Arthur's half-brother through Igraine; Cador's son Constantine succeeded Arthur as king of Britain in the Historia Regum Britanniae. Various works mention or feature Arthur's nieces and occasionally also different nephews.

There are furthermore various other more distant family members, such as the case of the historical Romano-British leader Ambrosius Aurelianus being turned into his uncle (Uther's brother) in Geoffrey's tradition deriving Arthur's lineage from the self-proclaimed Western Roman Emperor Constantine II of Britain, who in this version of the legend is presented as Arthur's grandfather. One important figure of no actual blood relation to Arthur is Ector, featuring as secret foster-father of the young Arthur in much of the romance tradition, thus also making Ector's son Kay Arthur's foster-brother.

Offspring
Although Arthur is given sons in both early and late Arthurian tales, he is rarely granted significant further generations of descendants. This is at least partly because of the premature deaths of his sons, who in the later tradition usually (and prominently) include Mordred. In some cases, including in Le Morte d'Arthur, Guinevere's failure to produce a legitimate heir contributes to the fall of Arthur.

Amr is the first to be mentioned in Arthurian literature, appearing in the 9th-century Historia Brittonum:

Why Arthur chose or was forced to kill his son is never made clear. The only other reference to Amr comes in the post-Galfridian Welsh romance Geraint, where "Amhar son of Arthur" is one of Arthur's four chamberlains along with Bedwyr's son Amhren.

Gwydre is similarly unlucky, being slaughtered by the giant boar Twrch Trwyth in Culhwch and Olwen, along with two of Arthur's maternal uncles. No other references to either Gwydre or Arthur's uncles survive.

Another son, known only from a possibly 15th-century Welsh text, is said to have died on the field of Camlann:

Sanddef [Bryd Angel] drive the crow 
off the face of Duran [son of Arthur].
Dearly and belovedly his mother raised him.
Arthur [sang it]

More is known of Arthur's son Llacheu. He is one of the "Three Well-Endowed Men of the Island of Britain", according to the Triad 4, and he fights alongside Cei in the early Arthurian poem Pa gur yv y porthaur?. Like his father is in Y Gododdin, Llacheu appears in the 12th-century and later Welsh poetry as a standard of heroic comparison and he also seems to have been similarly a figure of local topographic folklore too. Taken together, it is generally agreed that all these references indicate that Llacheu was a figure of considerable importance in the early Arthurian cycle. Nonetheless, Llacheu too dies, with the speaker in the pre-Galfridian poem Ymddiddan Gwayddno Garanhir ac Gwyn fab Nudd remembering that he had "been where Llacheu was slain / the son of Arthur, awful in songs / when ravens croaked over blood." The romance character based on him, Lohot, also dies young.

Medraut/Mordred is a major exception to this tradition of a childless death for Arthur's sons. Mordred, like Amr, is killed by Arthur – at Camlann – according to Geoffrey of Monmouth and the post-Galfridian tradition but, unlike the others, he is ascribed two sons, both of whom rose against Arthur's successor and cousin Constantine III with the help of the Saxons. However, in Geoffrey's Historia (when the motifs of Arthur's killing of Mordred and Mordred's sons first appear), Mordred was not Arthur's son. His relationship with Arthur was reinterpreted in the Vulgate Cycle, as he was made the result of an unwitting incest between Arthur and his sister. This tale is preserved in the later romances, with the motif of Arthur knowing by Merlin that Mordred would grow up to kill him; and so by the time of the Post-Vulgate Cycle Arthur has devised a plot, Herod-like, to rid of all children born on the same day as Mordred in order to try to save himself from this fate. The Post-Vulgate version also features another of Arthur's illegitimate sons, Arthur the Less, who survives for as long as Mordred but remains fiercely loyal to Arthur.

Other literature has expanded Arthur's immediate family further. His daughter named Archfedd is found in only one Welsh source, the 13th-century Bonedd y Saint. A daughter named Hilde is mentioned in the 13th-century Icelandic Þiðreks saga (Thidrekssaga), while the Möttuls saga from around the same period features a son of Arthur by the named Aristes. Rauf de Boun's 1309 Petit Brut lists Arthur's son Adeluf III as a king of Britain, also mentioning Arthur's other children Morgan le Noir (Morgan the Black) and Patrike le Rous (Patrick the Red) by an unnamed Fairy Queen. Later on, a number of early modern works have occasionally given Arthur more of different sons and daughters.

Bloodline claims
Supposed direct lineage from King Arthur has been professed by some English monarchs, especially the ones of Welsh descent, among them the 15th-century King Henry VII (through Cadwaladr ap Cadwallon), who even named his first-born son after Arthur, and the 16th-century Queen Elizabeth I. In the Scottish Highlands, the descent from King Arthur remains included in rival genealogies of both Clan Arthur (MacArthur) and Clan Campbell, whose traditions involve Arthur's otherwise unknown son variably known as Merbis, Merevie, Smerbe or Smerevie. In Iberia, medieval and early modern genealogies attributed Queen Baddo, wife of the 6th-century Visigothic King Reccared I, as a daughter of British King Arthur.

Notes

References

Bibliography
Bromwich, R. Trioedd Ynys Prydein: the Welsh Triads (Cardiff: University of Wales, 1978).
Bromwich, R. and Simon Evans, D. Culhwch and Olwen. An Edition and Study of the Oldest Arthurian Tale (Cardiff: University of Wales Press, 1992).
Bryant, N. The High Book of the Grail: A translation of the 13th century romance of Perlesvaus (Brewer, 1996).
Coe, J. B. and Young, S. The Celtic Sources for the Arthurian Legend (Llanerch, 1995).
Green, T. "The Historicity and Historicisation of Arthur", Arthurian Resources.
Green, T. "Tom Thumb and Jack the Giant Killer: Two Arthurian Fairytales?" in Folklore 118.2 (August, 2007), pp. 123–40.
Green, T. Concepts of Arthur (Stroud: Tempus, 2007) .
Higham, N. J. King Arthur, Myth-Making and History (London: Routledge, 2002).
Jones, T. and Jones, G. The Mabinogion (London: Dent, 1949).
Lacy, N. J. Lancelot-Grail: The Old French Arthurian Vulgate and Post-Vulgate in Translation (New York: Garland, 1992–96), 5 volumes.
Padel, O. J. Arthur in Medieval Welsh Literature (Cardiff: University of Wales Press, 2000) .
Roberts, B. F. "Geoffrey of Monmouth, Historia Regum Britanniae and Brut Y Brenhinedd" in R. Bromwich, A.O.H. Jarman and B.F. Roberts (edd.) The Arthur of the Welsh (Cardiff: University of Wales Press, 1991), pp. 98–116.
Rowland, J. Early Welsh Saga Poetry: a Study and Edition of the Englynion (Cambridge, 1990).
Sims-Williams, P. "The Early Welsh Arthurian Poems" in R. Bromwich, A.O.H. Jarman and B.F. Roberts (edd.) The Arthur of the Welsh (Cardiff: University of Wales Press, 1991), pp. 33–71.
Tichelaar, Tyler R., King Arthur's Children: A Study in Fiction and Tradition (Reflections of Camelot) (Modern History Press, 2011).

External links

Fictional families
 
Legendary royal families
Welsh mythology